Strikeforce: Melendez vs. Healy was a planned mixed martial arts event that was to be held by Strikeforce. The event would have taken place on September 29, 2012 at the Power Balance Pavilion in Sacramento, California.

Cancellation
On September 23, 2012, Strikeforce announced it was cancelling this event, as Showtime opted to not air it following lightweight champion Gilbert Melendez suffering a knee injury in training, taking him out of a planned title defense against Pat Healy. Strikeforce CEO Scott Coker stated, "Without a television partner, we simply could not move forward with this event. We wish Gilbert a speedy recovery and will work diligently and quickly to reschedule the fighters affected by this news on upcoming cards."

The Melendez/Healy and Payan/Bravo bouts were both rescheduled for Strikeforce: Marquardt vs. Saffiedine on January 12, 2013, where Estevan Payan defeated Michael Bravo by second round TKO. However, Gilbert Melendez was replaced by Jorge Masvidal, and later, Kurt Holobaugh in the planned bout with Pat Healy due to injuries.

The proposed bout between Nah-Shon Burrell & Yuri Villefort was rescheduled for UFC 157 on February 23, 2013 following both fighters' signings with the UFC after the closure of Strikeforce in January 2013. Burrell defeated Villefort via unanimous decision.

Cancelled fight card

Preliminary card (Showtime Extreme) 
Lightweight bout: Estevan Payan vs. Michael Bravo
Light Heavyweight bout: Mike Kyle vs. Dion Staring
Welterweight bout: Nah-Shon Burrell vs. Yuri Villefort
Women's Bantamweight bout: Amanda Nunes vs. Cat Zingano
Lightweight bout: Jorge Gurgel vs. Mizuto Hirota

Main card (Showtime) 
Lightweight bout: Josh Thomson vs. Caros Fodor
Light Heavyweight bout: Gian Villante vs. Guto Inocente
Lightweight bout: Isaac Vallie-Flagg vs. Adriano Martins
Welterweight bout: Jorge Santiago vs. Quinn Mulhern
Lightweight Championship bout: Gilbert Melendez (c) vs. Pat Healy

References

Cancelled sports events
Melendez vs. Healy
2012 in mixed martial arts
Mixed martial arts in Sacramento, California
2012 in sports in California